Josette Elayi-Escaich (born 29 March 1943) is a French antiquity historian, Phoenician and Near-Eastern history specialist, and honorary scholar at the French National Center for Scientific Research (CNRS). Elayi authored numerous archaeology and history works, and literary novels. She is well known to the French public through her novels and for her calls for reform and activism against the CNRS research policy bias. In 2007 Elayi was decorated Knight of the Legion of Honor by the French state.

Early life and education 
Josette Elayi née Escaich was born on 29 March 1943 in Les Bordes-sur-Lez, a small former commune now merged into Bordes-Uchentein in the Couserans (part of the Ariège department) in France's Pyrenees mountains. She studied in the nearby town of Saint-Girons. At the Saint-Girons high school, Elayi had an affinity for science and literature, but a skiing accident caused her to fall behind in science. Elayi recounts that "the literary course was much more rewarding than the sciences at the time". Elayi's parents wanted her to become a teacher, but after her baccalaureate, she went to Toulouse to study classical literature. Elayi is a holder of a Doctorat ès Lettres, the highest doctoral degree in France, and multiple other degrees in oriental languages from Lyon, Paris and Nancy universities.

Work, research and academia 
Elayi taught literature in Emilie de Rodat school in Toulouse between 1966 and 1968 before moving on to Notre-Dame school in Lyon where she taught for the next four years. In 1973, Elayi obtained a teaching position in the Lebanese University's faculty of letters in Beirut. Elayi's interest for the history of the Phoenicians was stirred during her short stay in Beirut. When the Lebanese civil war broke out in 1975, Elayi moved to Baghdad where she taught French literature at the Al-Mustansiriya University until 1978. Elayi settled in Paris in 1980, she taught in the Lycée Charlemagne  before joining the CNRS as a researcher in ancient history in 1982.

Elayi is versed in fifteen modern and extinct languages. Elayi developed a multidisciplinary historiography method that combines epigraphy, numismatics, archaeology, economics and sociology; she applied this methodology in her works on the history of the Phoenicians. She writes regularly in journals and has received two prizes from the Académie des Inscriptions et Belles-Lettres, and a prize from the French Numismatic Society.

Phoenician and Near-Eastern history studies 
In 1982, when she was recruited by the CNRS as a senior researcher, Elayi found that her field of research, the history of ancient Phoenicia, was not included in university curricula; it was confined to the Orientalism department which existed until 1991. Phoenician studies were then consigned to the department of Antiquity studies. The CNRS allowed Elayi full-time research and freedom to choose her subjects without teaching-hours constraints.  In 1988 her relationship with the CNRS took a negative turn; faced with the lack of support of the committee, Elayi started her own research group, the Association for the research on Syria-Palestine in the Persian Period (ASPEP). ASPEP was embraced and supported by an international network of researchers and obtained public and private funding. Elayi also launched and directs a specialized international journal the Transeuphratène, and wrote a number of historical monographs about Phoenicia and the Ancient Near East. Elayi has also organized more than thirty international and regional meetings. Her scientific program is aimed to develop the little-explored field of Phoenician history using multidisciplinary tools.

Her celebrated Trésors de monnaies phéniciennes et circulation monétaire (Ve-IVe siècles avant J.-C.) [Treasures of Phoenician coins and monetary circulation (5th-4th centuries B.C.)] showcases 75 Phoenician coin treasure troves among which 20 that were unpublished. The work highlights aspects of the economic and political history of Phoenician and ancient Near-Eastern cities in the 4th and 5th centuries BC; it delves into and adds new chronological data to the political and economic context of the first bronze coins production, circulation, control and production workshops. This research was followed up by her 2016 Phoenician Coinages, a  body of knowledge completely dedicated to mainland Phoenicia numismatics under the Persian hegemony. The book summarizes 59 monographs and journal articles written following over 30 years of research by Elayi, her spouse Alain-Gérard, and other contributing scholars;  noting that Elayi and her spouse developed an original method for the metrological study of coins including distinguishing monetary standards or legal weight, from a manufactured standard.

Literary work 
Elayi has written a number of novels that draw inspiration from her real life experiences and contemporary issues. In 2009, she published her first novel  [The survivor]  based on her experience of the civil war in Beirut. Two years later, Elayi wrote her second novel  [Secrets of granite]; the book is inspired by her native Ariège region.  [The shadow of Saddam] came out in 2015; the geopolitical thriller portrays Saddam Hussein before his seizure of power. Her 2017  [Why I became a terrorist] came two years after the Paris terrorist attacks, it follows a Spanish student's descent into    extremism. Elayi's 2018 novel  [Arwad, a drifting Syrian island] draws parallels between the fall of the insular Phoenician city of Arwad and war-time Syria. In 2019 Elayi published Ange Garelli where the Corsican protagonist is haunted by the discovery of a secret linking him to Napoleon Bonaparte.

Personal life 
Elayi is married to Alain-Gérard Elayi, a Lebanese nuclear scientist; they have two children together.

Personal views and activism 
Elayi who had a rocky relationship with the CNRS launched an attack against what she described as the CNRS of corporatism, ambiguity, and bias under the guise of scientific democracy when evaluating French research. She accused the CNRS of making errors of judgment in the recruitment and promotion of researchers and scientific teams, leading to the deterioration of the quality of French research. This crisis was particularly marked after the 2002 and 2003 CNRS budget cuts causing worsening researcher working conditions and the decline of their financial resources. Elayi committed to system reform. She took on media outlets and issued two books where she elaborated her views on CNRS research dysfunctions and proposed a better distribution of credits based on a correct assessment of the competence of researchers. Elayi was consulted by successive research ministers in an effort to create the Agency for the Evaluation of Research and Higher education which saw the light in 2007.

Elayi is a vocal defender of the teaching of classical languages, which was threatened by curriculum reforms spearheaded by then-Minister of National education and research Najat Vallaud-Belkacem. The reforms proposed to replace Latin and Greek classes by an "initiation to ancient languages" course within the French courses, and to integrate the teaching of these two languages within the French literature courses. Elayi criticized the lack of a timetable, a program, funding or continuity and expressed indignation that teaching of classical languages would be left to non-specialized teachers and to the discretion of headmasters. Despite nation-wide polemic the bill was passed in August 2016.

Awards and distinctions 
In 1995 the Académie des Inscriptions et Belles Lettres awarded Elayi with the Gregor Mendel prize for her work on coin economy and circulation in Phoenicia and the Ancient Near-East in the 5th and 4th centuries BC. Six years later, the academy awarded Elayi and Hussein Sayegh with the Adolphe Noël des Vergers  prize for their research on the Phoenician port quarter of Beirut. In 2001, she received the Babut Prize from the French Numismatic Society for her research on ancient coins. In 2007 Elayi was decorated Knight of the Legion of Honor by then Minister of superior education François Goulard for her work on Phoenician history.

Works 
The WorldCat database lists more than 200 publications by Josette Elayi in her various fields of expertise; she has authored more than 40 books and is the editor of seventy one books.

This following is a list of her most widely held publications:

Notes

References 

Chevaliers of the Légion d'honneur
20th-century French historians
21st-century French historians
Archaeologists of the Near East
1943 births
Phoenician-Punic studies
Living people